Llaguarres or Laguarres is a locality located in the municipality of Capella, Aragon, in Huesca province, Aragon, Spain. As of 2020, it has a population of 65.

Geography 
Llaguarres is located 99km east of Huesca.

References

Populated places in the Province of Huesca